Daha Balunga  is a 2013 Indian Odia language drama featured film directed by Sudhakar Basanta. The film stars Babushaan, Sanjana Mitra and Jackie Shroff. Abhijit Majumdar is the music director.

Cast
 Babushaan as Omkar Mohanty
 Sanjana Mitra as Ruby
 Jackie Shroff as Arun Singh Deo
 Bijay Mohanty as Uttam Mohanty 
 Tandra Ray as Mamata Mohanty
 Aparajita Mohanty as Arun's wife
 Pintu Nanda as Bikram
 Sonia Sarkar Dey as Shalini
 Praygan Khatua as Chingidi
 Saroj Das as Principal
 Choudhury Jayaprakash Das as Saler
 Trupti Sinha as Jeje Maa

Track listing

References

External links
 

2010s Odia-language films
Indian films about revenge
Films about amnesia
Indian action drama films
2013 action drama films
2013 films
Indian courtroom films
Indian gangster films
Films set in Odisha
Films shot in Odisha